Daisy Fried (born 1967, Ithaca, New York) is an American poet.

Life
Fried graduated from Swarthmore College in 1989.

Her work has appeared in The London Review of Books, The Nation, Poetry, The New Republic, American Poetry Review, Antioch Review, Threepenny Review, Triquarterly.

She teaches creative writing in the Warren Wilson College MFA Program for Writers, and has taught creative writing as the Grace Hazard Conkling Poet-in-Residence at Smith College, at Haverford College, Bryn Mawr College, Villanova University, Temple University, University of Pennsylvania, the low-residency MFA program at Warren Wilson College and the Fine Arts Work Center in Provincetown. She has written prose about poetry for Poetry, The New York Times and The Threepenny Review and has been a blogger for Harriet, the blog of the Poetry Foundation.

She lives with her husband, Jim Quinn, a writer (not the radio talk show host), and their daughter, in Philadelphia.

Awards
 1998 Pew Fellowships in the Arts
 1999 Agnes Lynch Starrett Poetry Prize, for She Didn't Mean to Do It
 2004 Hodder Fellowship from Princeton University
 2005 Cohen Award from Ploughshares for "Shooting Kinesha"
 2006 Guggenheim Fellow
 2007 Finalist for the National Book Critics Circle Awards for My Brother is Getting Arrested Again
 2009 Poetry magazine Editor's Prize for best feature article in the past year for "Sing God-Awful Muse"
 Pushcart Prize
 Pennsylvania Council on the Arts Fellowship

Works
Books
 
 
 

Poems Online

Anthologies
 
 
 
  (Translator)

Essays

References

External links

1967 births
Living people
Agnes Lynch Starrett Poetry Prize winners
Writers from Ithaca, New York
Swarthmore College alumni
Pew Fellows in the Arts
American women poets
21st-century American women